Thijs is a common Dutch given name and surname. It is a short form of Matthijs (Dutch form of Matthew) or Timothijs or Timotheus (Dutch forms of Timothy). The ij is pronounced .

Some notable people with this name are:

Given name
Thijs Al (born 1980), Dutch mountain biker
Thijs Berman (born 1957), Dutch politician
Thijs Libregts (born 1941), Dutch football coach
Thijs Maris (1839–1917), Dutch painter, etcher and lithographer
Thijs van Leer (born 1948), Dutch singer-songwriter, composer and producer, lead singer, flautist and keyboardist with the band Focus
Thijs Westbroek, Dutch DJ and producer
Thijs de Vlieger, Dutch DJ and producer, member of the trio Noisia
Thijs Zonneveld, (born 1980) Dutch journalist and a retired cyclist
All articles beginning with Thijs

Surname
Bernd Thijs (born 1978), Belgian footballer
Erika Thijs (1960–2011), Belgian politician
Erwin Thijs (born 1970), Belgian road bicycle racer
Jan Thijs (Johannes Thysius) (1621–1653), Dutch book collector
Jim Thijs (born 1980), Belgian triathlete
Lutgarde Thijs (born 1962), Belgian sprint canoeist
Paul Thijs (born 1946), Belgian long-distance runner
Pieter Thijs (1624–1677), Flemish painter

See also
Tijs, an even shorter Dutch form of Matthew
Thys, spelling variant, common in the Belgian province of Antwerp
Thijs is one of the first two satellites of the Galileo global navigation satellite system, named after a Belgian boy who won a drawing competition

Dutch masculine given names
Dutch-language surnames
Patronymic surnames
Surnames from given names